Golshavar or Goleshvar or Golashvar may refer to:
 Golshavar, Minab